"I've Had Enough" is a single by the band Earth, Wind & Fire issued in January 1982 on Columbia Records. The song peaked at No. 29 on the UK Pop Singles chart.

Overview
I've Had Enough was written by Philip Bailey, Greg Phillinganes and Brenda Russell. The song was included on the band's 1981 studio album
Raise!.

Critical reception
Barney Hoskyns of New Musical Express proclaimed "I've Had Enough is a perfect strike-out". Alan Coulthard of Record Mirror wrote "The other highlight is I've Had Enough, this set's successor to that pair of classics September and Fantasy. The intoxicating horn section and Philip Bailey's falsetto vocal transfer a song of unexceptional proportions into the realms of excellence".

Samples
I've Had Enough was later sampled by German house producer and DJ Tonka in 1998 in his song "Security".

Charts

References

1982 singles
Earth, Wind & Fire songs
Songs written by Brenda Russell
Songs written by Philip Bailey
Songs written by Greg Phillinganes
1981 songs
Columbia Records singles
Post-disco songs